The Ibex Reserve Protected Area is located in Hotat Bani Tamim town south Riyadh at small village called Al-Helwah. It has many different kinds of desert animals but is facing the problem of extinction due to hunting and loss of water supplies. Founded in 1988 and classified in IUCN Management Category II.

Flora 
Approximately 265 plant species were reported in 49 families, of which the largest family is Poaceae, followed by Asteraceae, Cruciferae and Leguminosae.

References

External links

 hotah1.jpg
 hotah1.jpg
 hotah9.jpg
 hotah13.jpg
 www.swc.gov.sa/English/ibex.aspx

Riyadh Province
Protected areas of Saudi Arabia